Lubomír Nácovský (26 May 1935 – 10 March 1982 in Kralupy nad Vltavou) was a Czech sport shooter who competed in the 1964 Summer Olympics and in the 1968 Summer Olympics. He won a bronze medal in the rapid fire pistol at the 1964 Summer Olympics.

References

1935 births
1982 deaths
Czech male sport shooters
ISSF pistol shooters
Olympic shooters of Czechoslovakia
Shooters at the 1964 Summer Olympics
Shooters at the 1968 Summer Olympics
Olympic bronze medalists for Czechoslovakia
Olympic medalists in shooting
Medalists at the 1964 Summer Olympics
People from Kralupy nad Vltavou
Sportspeople from the Central Bohemian Region